Pušća Bistra is a Croatian comedy film directed by Filip Sovagovic. It was released in 2005.

Cast
 Enes Vejzovic - Pero
 Mladen Vulic - Folnegovic
 Ranko Zidaric - Surla
 Dragan Despot - Tajkun
 Natalija Djordjevic - Mariola
 Jelena Miholjevic - Kuna
 Anja Sovagovic-Despot - Margarinka (as Anja Sovagovic)
 Predrag 'Predjo' Vusovic - Zvonaric
 Zeljko Vukmirica - Timor
 Branko Menicanin - Zamor
 Danko Ljustina - Sef sale
 Bojan Navojec - Portir
 Slavko Brankov - Tuba-Truba
 Nenad Cvetko - Papinjo zdero

External links
 

2005 films
Croatian-language films
2005 comedy films
2005 directorial debut films
Croatian comedy films